The men's 60 metres event at the 2017 European Athletics Indoor Championships was held on 4 March 2017 at 10:20 (heats), at 18:35 (semifinals) and 20:57 (final) local time.

Medalists

Records

Results

Heats
Qualification: First 3 in each heat (Q) and the next 4 fastest (q) advance to the Semifinal.

Semifinals
Qualification: First 4 in each heat (Q) advance to the Final.

Final

References

2017 European Athletics Indoor Championships
60 metres at the European Athletics Indoor Championships